The Senate Republican Policy Committee is the policy research arm of the Republican Conference. Its predecessor, the Senate Republican Steering Committee was formed in March 1944 after Leader Charles L. McNary's death. It became formally funded and renamed the Policy Committee in 1947 along with its Democratic counterpart, the Senate Democratic Policy Committee, after the Legislative Reorganization Act of 1946.

According to Congressional Quarterly, "the Policy Committee is in effect a legislative think tank. The committee organizes the prominent Tuesday lunches with summaries of major bills, analysis of roll call votes and distribution of issue papers."

List of chairs

References

External links
 Official website

Leaders of the United States Senate
Senate Republican Party Committee
Lists related to the United States Senate